Ottavi is an Italian surname. Notable people with the surname include:

Ottavio Ottavi (1849–1893), Italian oenologist
Paolo Ottavi (born 1986), Italian artistic gymnast

Italian-language surnames